Peter Pond (January 18, 1739 – 1807) was an American explorer, cartographer, merchant and soldier who was a founding member of the North West Company and the Beaver Club. Though he was born and died in Milford, Connecticut, most of his life was spent in northwestern North America.

Early life
 

Pond, born on in January 18, 1739 at Milford, Connecticut, began his fur trading career with his father out of Fort Detroit. He traded throughout the regions south of Lake Superior and west of Lake Michigan, which later became Minnesota and Wisconsin. During the French and Indian War, Pond enlisted in the Connecticut Regiment, a provincial infantry unit. Through his business he became acquainted with Alexander Henry the elder, Simon McTavish and the brothers Thomas, Benjamin and Joseph Frobisher. They formed the North West Company (NWC) which developed a fierce rivalry with the Hudson's Bay Company (HBC). In search of new fur resources he explored west of the Great Lakes. In 1776–1778 he wintered at a fur post he established at the junction of the Sturgeon River and North Saskatchewan River near present-day Prince Albert, Saskatchewan. The site is today a National Historic Site.

At Lac La Ronge, Jean-Étienne Waddens had a lucrative trade with “the Northward Indians” coming from Lake Athabasca. In late 1781, he was joined by Peter Pond, a man who too represented the company's interests. However, they were on bad terms. In March 1782, Waddens was fatally wounded in a fight, which has been described as murder. In 1783, Mrs Waddens requested Governor of Quebec, Frederick Haldimand to arrest Pond, submitting an affidavit of one of Waddens’ men. Pond was examined in 1785 but was not brought to trial, most likely because Lac La Ronge lay in the territories of the HBC, beyond the jurisdiction of the Province of Quebec.

Explorations

In 1783, Pond's explorations led him to the Athabasca, a region stretching from Lac Île-à-la-Crosse to the Peace River. There he explored waterways around Lake Athabasca and determined the approximate locations of Great Slave Lake and Great Bear Lake from First Nations peoples of the area. From his notes and diaries Peter Pond drew a map showing rivers and lakes of the Athabasca region, including what was known of the whole area from Hudson Bay to the Rocky Mountains and interpolating his information to the Arctic Ocean or Northwest Passage.

In 1785, one copy of Pond's map, accompanied by a detailed report, was submitted to the United States Congress and a second to the Lieutenant Governor of Quebec, Henry Hamilton. Pond needed financial support to carry his explorations to the limits of North America's northwest, but the British government was not forthcoming. A partner in the NWC, founded in 1784, he was in charge of the company business in the Athabasca and Peace River areas. An ambitious man with a reputation for having a violent temper, he was implicated in two murders (one of a rival trader): Although acquitted on the murder charges, the company replaced him with Alexander Mackenzie. In the process of taking over the management of the business Mackenzie learned a great deal from Peter Pond about the Athabasca and Peace River region. Pond left the NWC in 1788.

Later life and death

Mackenzie was intrigued by Pond's belief that the tributaries of that area, which could be seen gathering into a great river flowing northwestward, flowed to the Northwest Passage. Mackenzie took the initiative to follow up on Pond's belief and followed this great river to its mouth; the watercourse, now called the Mackenzie River, did in fact flow to the Northwest Passage section of the Arctic Ocean. Peter Pond had contributed to the mapping of Canada by drawing the general outline of the river basin that Mackenzie recorded in 1789. The maps that Peter Pond subsequently drew, based on his explorations and on the information provided to him by First Nations peoples, ultimately gained international recognition for Pond at the end of the 18th century.

In 1790, Pond sold his shares in the NWC to William McGillivray. He returned to Milford, Connecticut, where he died in 1807.

References

Further reading

External links 
Peter Pond Find a grave

1739 births
1807 deaths
American duellists
American fur traders
Explorers of Canada
Explorers of North America
North West Company people
People from Milford, Connecticut
Persons of National Historic Significance (Canada)